SoftDent is a practice management software for dental offices. Originally developed by InfoSoft, based in White Marsh, MD. SoftDent was purchased by PracticeWorks which was then bought by Kodak. In May 2007, Kodak sold the dental PMS software business to Canadian company Onex, renamed Carestream, which currently markets and supports the SoftDent application. Carestream Dental split from Carestream Health in 2017 to be a stand-alone company. The application is not suited for very large offices or multi-location offices. The most recent version V18 was released in August 2019. CS SoftDent uses the C-tree database..

References

External links
 ADA Vendor Directory of Practice Management Software
 SoftDent

Dental practice management software
Business software for Windows